William McCallum (born 30 March 1942) is a Scottish former footballer who played as a central defender, mainly for hometown club Motherwell, where he spent 14 years; he was the club's 'player of the year' in the 1971–72 season. After leaving Fir Park, he served short spells with St Mirren, Dunfermline Athletic and Raith Rovers.

References

1942 births
Living people
Footballers from Motherwell
Association football central defenders
Scottish footballers
Douglas Water Thistle F.C. players
Motherwell F.C. players
St Mirren F.C. players
Dunfermline Athletic F.C. players
Raith Rovers F.C. players
Scottish Junior Football Association players
Scottish Football League players